Suddenly is a 1954 black and white American noir crime film directed by Lewis Allen with a screenplay written by Richard Sale.  The drama stars Frank Sinatra and Sterling Hayden, and features James Gleason and Nancy Gates.

The story concerns a small California town whose tranquility is shattered when the train of the president of the United States is scheduled to make a stop in the town, and a hired assassin and his henchmen take over a home that provides a perfect vantage point from which to assassinate the president.

Plot
In post-war America, a train carrying the president of the United States is scheduled to make a stop in the small town of Suddenly, California. Claiming to be FBI agents checking up on security before the president’s arrival, three men arrive at the home of the Bensons: Ellen, a widow, her young son “Pidge,” and her father-in-law, “Pop” Benson.  The house is on top of a hill that looks down on the station where the presidential train is scheduled to stop, making it a perfect perch from which to shoot the president when his train stops. However, it soon becomes clear that the men are not Government agents but assassins, led by the ruthless John Baron, who take over the house and hold the family hostage, planning to shoot the president from a window in the home which has a good view of the railway station.

Sheriff Tod Shaw arrives with Dan Carney, the Secret Service agent in charge of the president's security detail. When he does, Baron and his gangsters shoot Carney dead and a bullet fractures Shaw's left arm. Baron straightens his arm and lets him go to the bedroom. Mrs Benson puts his arm in a sling and they all return to watch the events unfold.

Baron boasts about the Silver Star he won in the war for killing 16 Japs. (He later changes the story to killing 27 Jerries.) They set up a G/K.43 service rifle at the window, secured to a metal table. Baron explains he has nothing against the president but he is being paid $500,000 to kill him and money is his only motive. He has been paid half up front.

Pop broke the TV earlier and the TV repair man arrives amid the scene. All are threatened that the kid will be shot if they do not obey.

Baron sends Benny, one of his two henchmen, to check on the president's schedule, but shortly after confirming to Baron that the train is scheduled to stop in Suddenly at 5 p.m., Benny is killed in a shootout with the police. Meanwhile, Jud, a television repairman, has shown up at the house and also becomes a hostage. Pidge goes to his grandfather's dresser to get some medication and notices a fully loaded revolver which he replaces with his toy cap gun.

When the hostages try to appeal to Baron’s patriotism, it becomes clear that he has none: he has been hired to kill the president for money. But when Baron is confronted by the sheriff on the risks of killing the president, including whether he will ever see (let alone live to enjoy) his money, Baron's remaining henchman begins to show some reluctance to go through with the assassination. For Baron, however, these are the very least of his concerns, and it soon becomes clear that he is a psychopath whose pleasure comes from killingwho he kills and for what reason being of little importance to him.

In the meantime, the assassins have mounted a WWII German sniper rifle onto a metal table by the window overlooking the train station. Jud, under the guise of fixing the TV, discreetly hooks the table up to the 5000-volt plate output of the family television. Pop Benson then intentionally spills a cup of water on the floor beneath the table. Although the hope is that Baron will be shocked and killed in this way, it is his remaining henchman who touches the table first and is electrocuted, reflexively firing the rifle repeatedly and attracting the attention of police at the train station. Baron shoots and mortally wounds Jud, disconnects the electrical hook-up and aims the rifle as the president's train arrives at the station, only to see the train pass straight through. As an utterly surprised Baron says “[i]t didn’t stop,” Ellen Benson shoots Baron in the abdomen, and Shaw picks up a gun and shoots him a second time. Baron, having dropped to the floor, begs for mercy —— "No, don't...no, please...no, no, no" —— and dies.

In the aftermath of the harrowing incident, outside the local hospital Shaw confirms to Ellen that Jud “didn’t make it.” Telling Ellen that he needs to go back to his office, Shaw then makes plans to meet Ellen after church the next day, and they kiss. After she leaves, a driver stops to ask for directions and then asks for the name of the town.  When Shaw says it is “Suddenly,” the driver notes that “that’s a funny name for a town.” After the driver pulls away, Shaw says to himself, "Oh, I don't know. I don't know about that."

Cast

 Frank Sinatra as John Baron
 Sterling Hayden as Sheriff Tod Shaw
 James Gleason  as Peter "Pop" Benson
 Nancy Gates as Ellen Benson
 Kim Charney as Peter "Pidge" Benson III
 Willis Bouchey as Dan Carney, Chief Secret Service Agent
 Paul Frees as Benny Conklin (also voice of TV announcer)
 Christopher Dark as Bart Wheeler
 James O'Hara as Jud Hobson (credited as James Lilburn)
 Ken Dibbs as Wilson

 Clark Howat as Haggerty
 Charles Smith as Bebop
 Paul Wexler as Deputy Sheriff Slim Adams
 Dan White as Burg
 Richard Collier as Ed Hawkins
 Roy Engel as first driver
 Ted Stanhope as second driver
 Charles Wagenheim as Kaplan
 John Berardino as trooper

Cast notes
 Frank Sinatra's role in Suddenly was the first occasion on which he was cast as a "heavy" in a dramatic film.
 Actor Paul Frees, who plays one of Sinatra's henchmen, is best known for his voiceover work, such as for the character Boris Badenov in the Rocky and Bullwinkle cartoons.

Production
Writer Richard Sale got his idea for the short story that was the basis of the film from articles in the newspaper about President Dwight D. Eisenhower's visits to Palm Springs, California, by train. There were differences between the story and the film, the most thematically important being that the mother in the story was not bitter about her husband's death in World War II, and in fact, was not present during the assassination attempt, so never had to make the choice the mother in the film has to make: whether to shoot and kill the assassin when the opportunity arises.

The exterior scenes for Suddenly were filmed in Saugus, California, which is now part of the city of Santa Clarita. Saugus Railway Station, which features  prominently, still exists, though not in its original location. At the time of filming Saugus was served by a spur line that branched off from the main Southern Pacific coast line, terminating at Ventura. The spur line operated for almost a century but was decommissioned and torn up during the 1970s. Saugus station closed permanently in 1978, but local residents saved the historic building (opened in 1888) and had it moved to a new location, where it now serves as a museum. The building was subsequently also used as a location in the 1990 film The Grifters, starring Angelica Huston and John Cusack.

The production company, Libra Productions, was producer Robert Brassler's company, and Suddenly was his first independent film. Previously, Brassler had worked for Twentieth Century Fox.

Reception

When the film was released, Bosley Crowther, film critic for The New York Times, liked the direction of the film and the acting, and writing "Yet such is the role that Mr. Sinatra plays in Suddenly!, a taut little melodrama that... [it] shapes up as one of the slickest recent items in the minor movie league... we have several people to thank—particularly Richard Sale for a good script, which tells a straight story credibly, Mr. Allen for direction that makes both excitement and sense, Mr. Bassler for a production that gets the feel of a small town and the cast which includes Sterling Hayden, James Gleason and Nancy Gates." Crowther especially liked Sinatra's performance. He wrote, "Mr. Sinatra deserves a special chunk of praise...In Suddenly! he proves it in a melodramatic tour de force."

The staff reviewer at Variety gave the film a good review and praised the acting. He wrote "[Sinatra] inserts plenty of menace into a psycho character, never too heavily done, and gets good backing from his costar, Sterling Hayden, as sheriff, in a less showy role but just as authoritatively handled. Lewis Allen's direction manages a smart piece where static treatment easily could have prevailed."

The reviewer for Newsweek wrote about Sinatra's performance that he "superbly refutes the idea that the straight-role potentialities which earned an Academy Award for him in From Here to Eternity were one-shot stuff. In Suddenly, the happy-go-lucky soldier of Eternity becomes one of the most repellent killers in American screen history." Film critic Carl Mazek  in Film Noir: An Encyclopedic Reference to the American Style (1982) makes the case that the "Machiavellian attitude" of John Baron links the picture with the brutal films noir of the 1950s like The Big Night (1951) and Kiss Me Deadly (1955). Moreover, he continued:
The sense of claustrophobia and despair unleashed by the assassins in Suddenly is completely amoral, and totally opposite of the style of harassment found in such non-noir, socially redemptive films as The Desperate Hours [1955]...There are no reasons given, or asked for, regarding the assassination — the entire incident functions as a nightmare, a very real nightmare that invades the serenity of a small town. At the end of the film, it is apparent that the Benson family will never be the same, suddenly scarred by people out of nowhere who irrevocably disrupt their middle-class tranquility.

On review aggregator website Rotten Tomatoes, the film holds a contemporary approval rating of 100% based on nine reviews, with an average rating of 6.78/10.

History

Influence

In 1959, five years after the release of Suddenly, The Manchurian Candidate, a novel written by Richard Condon, a former Hollywood press agent, was published. As with Suddenly, Condon's book features a mentally troubled former war hero who, at the climax of the story, uses a rifle with a scope to shoot at a politician, in the case of the novel, a presidential candidate. The Manchurian Candidate was released as a film in 1962, starring Sinatra, but this time he was trying to prevent an assassination being committed by Laurence Harvey. Paul Frees, who plays Benny Conklin in Suddenly, served as the narrator of The Manchurian Candidate (1962).

Sinatra asked United Artists to withdraw Suddenly from circulation because he heard the rumor that Lee Harvey Oswald had seen it before shooting President Kennedy. According to Hollywood legend, Sinatra bought up all remaining copies of Suddenly and had them destroyed, but this was not true. Sinatra also supposedly wanted The Manchurian Candidate – of which he was a producer – withdrawn after the assassination, but its disappearance was caused by its having completed a normal film release schedule.

A remake of Suddenly, starring Dominic Purcell and directed by Uwe Boll, was released in 2013.

Loss of copyright
The film's copyright was not renewed and it entered the public domain; it can be downloaded and viewed for free online. Prior to it entering the public domain, the film was widely available from a number of discount/public domain distributors. Suddenly was colorized for home video by Hal Roach Studios in 1986, rendering Sinatra's blue eyes brown. A remastered colorized version by Legend Films was released to DVD on June 16, 2009, which also includes a newly restored print of the original black and white film.

Serge Bromberg, a film preservationist based in Paris, completely restored the film from a camera negative for Lobster Films, which released it in 2018.

See also
 Assassinations in fiction
 List of films featuring home invasions
 List of films with a 100% rating on Rotten Tomatoes

References

Notes

Bibliography

External links

 
 
 
 
 
 
 

1954 films
1950s crime thriller films
American black-and-white films
American crime thriller films
Articles containing video clips
1950s English-language films
Film noir
Films about assassinations
Films about fictional presidents of the United States
Films directed by Lewis Allen
Films scored by David Raksin
Films set in California
Films shot in California
Home invasions in film
Films about hostage takings
Self-censorship
United Artists films
Film controversies
1950s American films